This is a list of villages of the Ivano-Frankivsk Oblast (province) of western Ukraine. There are currently 765 villages within Ivano-Frankivsk Oblast.

Ivano-Frankivsk Raion

Kalush Raion

Kolomyia Raion

Kosiv Raion

Nadvirna Raion

Verkhovyna Raion

See also
List of Canadian place names of Ukrainian origin

External links
 All settlements in Prykarpattia 

Ivano-Frankivsk